Jeff Sharlet may refer to:
 Jeff Sharlet (activist) (1942–1969), American anti-war activist
 Jeff Sharlet (writer) (born 1972), American journalist, author, and academic